The Turquoise Stakes (Japanese ターコイズステークス) is a Grade 3 horse race for Thoroughbred fillies and mares aged three and over, run in December over a distance of 1600 metres on turf at Nakayama Racecourse.

It was first run in 2015 and has held Grade 3 status since 2017.

Winners since 2015

See also
 Horse racing in Japan
 List of Japanese flat horse races

References

Turf races in Japan